The Red Warning is a 1923 American silent Western film directed by Robert N. Bradbury and starring Jack Hoxie, Fred Kohler, and Elinor Field.

Plot
As described in a film magazine review, ranchman David Ainslee loses his cattle through bandit raids, searches for a desert mine, and is found wounded and dying by Phil Haver. Phil brings the news to David's daughter Louise. Phil gives the young woman some gold, which he pretends is from the mine. He gathers a vigilante band and captures the cattle thieves, revenging himself on the man who killed Ainslee, and wins the young woman in the process.

Cast

Preservation
With no prints of The Red Warning located in any film archives, it is a lost film.

References

Bibliography
 Katchmer, George A. (1991). Eighty Silent Film Stars: Biographies and Filmographies of the Obscure to the Well Known. McFarland.

External links
 
 

1923 films
1923 Western (genre) films
1920s English-language films
American black-and-white films
Films directed by Robert N. Bradbury
Universal Pictures films
Silent American Western (genre) films
1920s American films